Lebanese Renewal Party (in Arabic حزب التجدد اللبناني) abbreviated as LRP was a Lebanese nationalist party established in 1972 by a number of staunch Lebanese nationalists including activist Etienne Saqr, poet Said Akl and writer May Murr. Its ideology was based on Phoenicianism and that the Lebanese nation is an independent non-Arab entity and is not part of the Arab World. It also warned against pan-Arabism, leftist ideology and the Palestinian military presence in Lebanon.

The party is considered a precursor of the more prominent Guardians of the Cedars (in Arabic حرّاس الأرز) also established by Etienne Saqr and later on, the LRP declared itself as the "political wing" of the more militarist Guardians of the Cedars and was eventually banned by the Lebanese government alongside the military wing.

See also
Guardians of the Cedars#Lebanese Renewal Party
Defunct political parties in Lebanon
Lebanese nationalist parties
Phoenicianism
Political parties with year of disestablishment missing
Political parties with year of establishment missing